James Richard Atkin, Baron Atkin,  (28 November 1867 – 25 June 1944), commonly known as Dick Atkin, was an Australian-born British judge, who served as a lord of appeal in ordinary from 1928 until his death in 1944. He is especially remembered as the judge giving the leading judgement in the case of Donoghue v Stevenson in 1932,  in which he established the modern law of negligence in the UK, and indirectly in most of the common law world.

Early life and practice

Atkin was the son of Robert Travers Atkin (1841–1872) and his wife, Mary Elizabeth née Ruck (1842–1920). Robert was from Kilgarriff, County Cork, Mary's father from Newington, Kent, and her mother from Merioneth, Wales. The couple married in 1864 and soon emigrated to Australia intending to take up sheep farming. However, little more than a year into their enterprise Robert was badly injured in a fall from a horse and the couple moved to Brisbane where Robert became a journalist and politician. He always thought of himself as a Queenslander, and was President of the London Welsh Trust from 1938 to 1944.

James was born at Ellandale cottage, Tank Street, off North Quay, Brisbane, the eldest of three sons but in 1871, his mother brought him and his siblings back to her own mother's house, "Pantlludw" on the River Dovey in Wales. His father died in Brisbane in the following year. James was much influenced by his grandmother and acquired from her an egalitarian instinct and a distaste for sanctimonious posturing. His mother's sister, Amy, was the first wife of Francis Darwin, third son of Charles Darwin and his wife Emma: there is a thank-you letter extant to Charles Darwin from the eleven-year-old Dick.

Atkin attended Friars School, Bangor, and Christ College, Brecon, and won a demyship to Magdalen College, Oxford, where he read classics and literae humaniores, enjoying playing tennis in his leisure time. Atkin was called to the bar by Gray's Inn in 1891 and scoured the London law courts assessing the quality of the advocates so as to decide where to apply for pupillage. He was ultimately impressed by Thomas Scrutton and became his pupil, joining fellow pupils Frank MacKinnon, a future Lord Justice of Appeal, and Robert Wright, another future Law Lord. He took chambers at 3 Pump Court but, as did most beginning barristers at the time, struggled to find work. He shared living accommodation with Arthur Hughes who later married Mary Vivian Hughes whose book A London Family 1870–1900 mentions Atkin. He eventually established a practice in commercial law, in particular in work on behalf of the London Stock Exchange, and became known as a subtle advocate with no need to rely on theatrical effects. His practice grew from about 1900 and made a favourable impression when appearing before the future Prime Minister of the United Kingdom H. H. Asquith who was sitting as an arbitrator. Asquith was so impressed that he secured a pupillage for his own son Raymond at Atkin's chambers. By 1906, The Times considered him probably the busiest junior at the Bar. In that year Atkin took silk. Once John Hamilton was made a judge in 1909 and Scrutton in 1910, Atkin dominated the commercial Bar.

Judge

He became a judge of the King's Bench division of the High Court in 1913, receiving a knighthood. Work at the King's Bench involved him in criminal cases which had been outside his experience as a barrister but he established a high reputation as a criminal judge. Reputedly, Atkin enjoyed his six years at the King's Bench more than any others of his legal career. The following nine at the Court of Appeal he enjoyed the least.

Atkin became a Lord Justice of Appeal in 1919. In the 1920 case of Meering v Graham-White Aviation Co Ltd Atkin showed his disapproval of unjustified restriction on civil liberties by holding (obiter) that a person could sue for false imprisonment even under circumstances where he had been unaware of his imprisonment at the time. Again in 1920, in Everett v Griffiths Atkin held that Everett was owed a duty of care by a Board of Guardians who had detained him as insane on inadequate grounds. However, Lord Justices Scrutton and Bankes held otherwise and their majority prevailed over Atkin's dissenting judgment.

From 1928 until his death he was a Lord of Appeal in Ordinary under the title Baron Atkin, of Aberdovey, in the County of Merioneth.

An Anglican, Atkin was strongly motivated by his Christian faith and relied on testing the law against the demands of common sense and the interests of the ordinary working man. He came to a settled view early on in hearing a case and, as a Law Lord, his colleagues often found him indefatigable in his opinions and difficult to persuade as to the merits of alternative views.

Donoghue v Stevenson

In 1932, as a member of the House of Lords, he delivered the leading judgment in the landmark case of Donoghue v. Stevenson concerning the alleged adverse effects from an alleged snail in a bottle of ginger beer served in a café in Paisley. The case established the modern law of negligence in the UK and, indirectly, in most of the rest of the common law world, with the major exception of the United States.

Liversidge v. Anderson

He is also remembered for his dissenting judgment in Liversidge v Anderson, in which he unsuccessfully asserted the courts' right to question the wide discretionary powers of the Home Secretary to detain subjects suspected of having 'hostile associations'.

Commercial law

He also gave the leading judgment in Bell v. Lever Brothers Ltd., still the leading authority on common mistake under English law.

Gray's Inn

The Inn had been at a low ebb when Atkin joined. It was impoverished, its dinners and functions poorly attended and its benchers lacking professional prestige. It was largely through Atkin's efforts, and those of F.E. Smith, that the Inn's prestige was restored. Atkin was himself three times Treasurer, Master of the Library and Master of Moots.

Personal life

Lucy Elizabeth (Lizzie) Hemmant (1867–1939) was the daughter of William Hemmant, a friend of Atkin's father from Brisbane. She had been born within 12 days and within  of Atkin. William also subsequently moved to London and was important in helping Atkin to establish his stock exchange contacts. Atkin married Lizzie Hemmant in 1893 after five years' engagement.

The couple had six daughters and two sons, the elder son being killed in World War I. Atkin's daughter Rosaline became a barrister of Gray's Inn. The fourth daughter, Nancy, to her father's delight, became an actress. Nancy made her debut in Liverpool and was discovered and brought to London by Charles Hawtrey and A. A. Milne. Atkin's grandson, by his daughter Lucy Atkin, was the politician and business leader Sir Toby Low, 1st Baron Aldington.

Atkin enjoyed the music hall and in particular the humour of George Robey and Marie Lloyd. He and his wife were fond of entertaining at their succession of town homes in Kensington with musical evenings. In 1912 Atkin realised his ambition of buying a house Craig-y-Don in Aberdovey and from that time, he spent every summer there with his family. At Aberdovey, Atkin enjoyed tennis, golf and bridge. He was an enthusiast for the literary works of Edgar Wallace. Atkin was President of the London Welsh Trust, which runs the London Welsh Centre, Gray's Inn Road, from 1938 until 1944. Atkin was popular with the community in Aberdovey and was paraded into the village on a hand-drawn cab on his appointment to the High Court. When possible, he sat as a Justice of the Peace in Towyn and Machynlleth, and eventually chaired Merionethshire Quarter Sessions.

He died of bronchitis in Aberdyfi where he was buried.

Honours

 Honorary fellowship of Magdalen College, Oxford (1924);
 Fellow of the British Academy (1938);
 Foreign Honorary Member of the American Academy of Arts and Sciences (1939);
 Honorary degrees:
 University of Oxford (1931);
 University of Cambridge (1936);
 University of Reading (1938); and
 University of London (1939).

A plaque was erected in 2012 at the Harry Gibbs Commonwealth Law Courts Building – built upon the land where Ellandale cottage once stood – commemorating the birthplace of Lord Atkin, placed on the 145th anniversary of his birth and the 80th anniversary of his judgement Donoghue v Stevenson. It was arranged by the TC Beirne School of Law, University of Queensland and the Federal Court of Australia.

Cases

High Court
 Barron v Potter [1915] 3 KB 593, small company deadlock

Court of Appeal
 Balfour v Balfour [1919] 2 KB 571
 Meering v Graham-White Aviation Co Ltd (1920) 122 LT 44
 Everett v Griffiths [1920] 3 KB 163
 Rose & Frank Co v JR Crompton & Bros Ltd [1923] 2 KB 261, intention to create legal relations in commerce
 R v Secretary of State for Home Affairs ex parte O'Brien [1923] 2 KB 361, internment of Irish
 Russian Commercial and Industrial Bank v Comptoir d'Estcompte de Mulhouse [1923] 2 KB 630, compensation for nationalisation by Russia of banks
 Rowland v Divall [1923] 2 KB 500, failure of consideration
 National Provincial Bank v Charnley [1924] 1 KB 431, meaning of a security interest
 Glassbrook Bros v Glamorgan County Council [1925] AC 270, dissenting in the Court of Appeal, liability of employer to pay for police protection
 Tournier v National Provincial and Union Bank of England [1924] 1 KB 461

House of Lords and Privy Council
 France v James Coombes & Co [1929] AC 496, definition of employee and inequality of bargaining power under section 8 of the Trade Boards Act 1909
 Bell v Lever Brothers Ltd [1932] AC 161, common mistake
 Donoghue v Stevenson [1932] AC 562, negligence
 Maritime National Fish Ltd v Ocean Trawlers Ltd [1935] UKPC 1, frustration
 Woolmington v DPP [1935] UKHL 1, presumption of innocence
 Way v Latilla [1937] 3 All ER 759
 Wilsons and Clyde Coal Ltd v English [1937] UKHL 2
 Labour Conventions Reference [1937] AC 326, Canadian federalism
 Reference re Alberta Statutes [1938] UKPC 46, striking down Alberta laws on social credit
 Vita Food Products Inc v Unus Shipping Co Ltd [1939] UKPC 7
 Nokes v Doncaster Amalgamated Collieries Ltd [1940] AC 1014, no transfer of employment contract without the employee's consent
 Southern Foundries (1926) Ltd v Shirlaw [1940] AC 701, implied terms
 United Australia Ltd v Barclays Bank Ltd [1941] AC 1, administrative law
 Fibrosa Spolka Akcyjna v Fairbairn Lawson Combe Barbour Ltd [1942] UKHL 4, frustration and failure of consideration
 Liversidge v Anderson [1942] AC 206

Notes

Secondary sources

External links 
 Parliamentary Archives, Papers of James Richard Atkin, Baron Atkin of Aberdovey (1867–1944)

1867 births
1944 deaths
People educated at Friars School, Bangor
Alumni of Magdalen College, Oxford
Law lords
20th-century English judges
People from Brisbane
Australian people of Irish descent
Australian people of Welsh descent
Australian life peers
Members of Gray's Inn
People educated at Christ College, Brecon
Welsh barristers
Welsh Anglicans
Deaths from bronchitis
Queen's Bench Division judges
Members of the Judicial Committee of the Privy Council
Fellows of the American Academy of Arts and Sciences
Fellows of the British Academy
Knights Bachelor
Members of the Privy Council of the United Kingdom
19th-century Welsh lawyers
Australian emigrants to the United Kingdom
Lords Justices of Appeal
Barons created by George V